Maryorie Belén Hernández Collao (born 20 March 1990) is a Chilean footballer who plays as a forward for Brazilian club AE 3B da Amazônia and the Chile women's national team.

International career
Hernández represented Chile at the 2008 FIFA U-20 Women's World Cup.

References 

1990 births
Living people
Chilean women's footballers
Women's association football forwards
Club Deportivo Palestino (women) players
Chile women's international footballers
Chilean expatriate women's footballers
Chilean expatriate sportspeople in Brazil
Expatriate women's footballers in Brazil